Athy is a town in County Kildare, Ireland.

Athy may also refer to:

Associated with Athy, Co. Kildare
 Athy (Parliament of Ireland constituency) in the 17th–18th centuries
 Athy railway station
 Athy Cricket Club
 Athy GAA
 Athy Rugby Club

People
 Athy (harpist) (born 1984), Argentinian harpist
 John Athy (fl. 1426–38), Sovereign of Galway
 Margaret Athy (fl. 1508), religious patron in Galway